Elaan may refer to:

 Elaan (1947 film), a Bollywood film directed by Mehboob Khan
 Elaan (1971 film), a Bollywood thriller film directed by K. Ramanlal
 Elaan (1994 film), a Hindi film directed by Guddu Dhanoa
 Elaan (2005 film), a Bollywood action thriller film
 Elaan (2011 film), a Bhojpuri film

See also
 Elan (disambiguation)
 Ilan (disambiguation)